Michael John Reiziger (born 3 May 1973) is a Dutch former professional footballer who played mainly as a right back, currently the assistant manager of AFC Ajax.

After making a name for himself at Ajax, with whom he won one Champions League, he went on to represent four teams in as many countries, notably Barcelona, for which he played 249 official games in seven years, as well as spells at Milan, Middlesbrough and PSV Eindhoven.

Reiziger represented the Dutch national team for a full decade, competing at three European Championships and the 1998 World Cup and finishing fourth in the latter tournament.

Playing career

Club
Born in Amstelveen, North Holland to Surinamese parents, Reiziger started his career with hometown club AFC Ajax, making his first-team debut at the age of 17 then serving two consecutive loan spells, with FC Volendam and FC Groningen; with the latter, in the 1993–94 season, he scored a career-best six goals while operating also as a midfielder.

Upon his return to Ajax, Reiziger established himself as a renowned defensive element, helping the side to, among other conquests, the 1994–95 edition of the UEFA Champions League. In 1996 he signed for A.C. Milan, but after a season marred by injury, he departed for FC Barcelona where he spent the following seven years, arriving at the same time as compatriot and former Ajax boss Louis van Gaal; though not an undisputed starter, he nonetheless featured heavily for the Catalans, making more than 200 overall appearances and helping to back-to-back La Liga titles.

In 2004, Reiziger moved to Middlesbrough on a Bosman transfer. He scored once in the league for Boro, against Aston Villa in December 2004. After another campaign plagued by physical problems, he left and returned to the Netherlands to see out his career at PSV Eindhoven (in his second year he won the Eredivisie, and was also reunited with Ajax, Barça and national teammate Patrick Kluivert, although the two rarely ever played).

International

Reiziger made his debut for the Dutch national team on 12 October 1994, against Norway. He played for his country at the UEFA Euro 1996, 1998 FIFA World Cup, Euro 2000 and Euro 2004, retiring from international play after the latter.

Shortly after signing for PSV, Reiziger said he would consider playing for the Netherlands again if the opportunity arose, but he was never recalled again, totalling 72 appearances in ten years.

Coaching career
After retiring, Reiziger settled in Barcelona. He later went on to coach Sparta Rotterdam at youth level and, subsequently and successively, acted as assistant to Gert Kruys and Alex Pastoor.

On 20 June 2017, Reiziger returned to Ajax as manager of the reserves who competed in the Eerste Divisie, replacing Marcel Keizer. In his first season in charge he led the squad to the league title, but they were ineligible for promotion. He also acted as interim for the first team during one match after the dismissal of Keizer, defeating Willem II 3–1 at home.

After Reiziger's contract expired, he was replaced by Mitchell van der Gaag at the helm of Ajax B. He was then offered a position as assistant coach of the first team, which he accepted.

Personal life
Reiziger's son, Gabriël (born 2005), also came through the Ajax youth system.

Career statistics

Club

International
Appearances and goals by national team and year

International goals
Scores and results list Reiziger's goal tally first.

Honours

Player
Ajax
Eredivisie: 1994–95, 1995–96
KNVB Cup: 1992–93
Dutch Supercup: 1994, 1995
UEFA Champions League: 1994–95
UEFA Cup: 1991–92
UEFA Super Cup: 1995
Intercontinental Cup: 1995

Barcelona
La Liga: 1997–98, 1998–99
Copa del Rey: 1997–98
UEFA Super Cup: 1997

PSV
Eredivisie: 2005–06, 2006–07

Manager
Jong Ajax
Eerste Divisie: 2017–18

References

External links

Beijen profile 

1973 births
Living people
Sportspeople from Amstelveen
Dutch sportspeople of Surinamese descent
Dutch footballers
Footballers from North Holland
Association football defenders
Eredivisie players
AFC Ajax players
FC Volendam players
FC Groningen players
PSV Eindhoven players
Serie A players
A.C. Milan players
La Liga players
FC Barcelona players
Premier League players
Middlesbrough F.C. players
UEFA Champions League winning players
Netherlands international footballers
UEFA Euro 1996 players
1998 FIFA World Cup players
UEFA Euro 2000 players
UEFA Euro 2004 players
Dutch expatriate footballers
Expatriate footballers in Italy
Expatriate footballers in Spain
Expatriate footballers in England
Dutch expatriate sportspeople in Italy
Dutch expatriate sportspeople in Spain
Dutch expatriate sportspeople in England
Dutch football managers
Eredivisie managers
Jong Ajax managers
AFC Ajax managers
AFC Ajax non-playing staff
Association football coaches